That Day is a signature single by Petaling Jaya band, One Buck Short. The song is arguably their best known and most popular single released by the band, and it gained heavy airplay on Malaysian English Radio stations. This song was the start of One Buck Short's success.

The song is typical of One Buck Short structure with complex guitar riffs and plenty of vocals. Unique to One Buck Short songs, towards the end, the song breaks into Reggae in Malay.

External links
 OBS Official Site
 One Buck Short on MySpace
 Watch on YouTube live in Malacca

One Buck Short songs
2003 songs
2003 singles